Gas flows from Turkey to Greece through a pipeline which is almost 300 km long. It is an incomplete transportation project that was proposed in the framework of the Southern Gas Corridor. It was proposed for the transportation of natural gas from Azerbaijan's Shah Deniz gas field Phase II to markets in Europe via Greece and Italy.  The Turkey–Greece pipeline was completed in 2007 while the Greece–Italy pipeline was not built, due to the competing Trans Adriatic Pipeline.

The Turkey–Greece pipeline is a  natural gas pipeline, which connects Turkish and Greek gas grids. The pipeline begins in Karacabey in Turkey and runs to Komotini in Greece.

History 
The agreement between Turkish gas company BOTAŞ and Greek gas company DEPA was signed on 28 March 2002. The intergovernmental agreement to build a natural gas pipeline between the two countries was signed on 23 December 2003 in Ankara. The foundation of the pipeline was laid on 3 July 2005 by the prime ministers Kostas Karamanlis and Recep Tayyip Erdoğan. It was completed in September 2007.  The pipeline was officially inaugurated on 18 November 2007.

Technical description 

See also

 Nabucco pipeline
 South Caucasus Pipeline
 South Stream

External links
 Turkey-Greece-Italy Interconnector Gas Pipeline (ITGI) on Global Energy Monitor

References

Proposed pipelines in Europe
Energy infrastructure completed in 2007
Natural gas pipelines in Turkey
Natural gas pipelines in Greece
Natural gas pipelines in Italy
Pipelines under the Mediterranean Sea
Italy–Turkey relations
Greece–Turkey relations
Greece–Italy relations